Rānui is a suburb of West Auckland, New Zealand, which is under the local governance of Auckland Council. The area is densely populated but close to the western fringe of the Auckland urban area.

The word 'rānui' in Māori means 'midday'.

Demographics

Rānui had a population of 13,755 at the 2018 New Zealand census, an increase of 1,860 people (15.6%) since the 2013 census, and an increase of 2,919 people (26.9%) since the 2006 census. There were 3,807 households, comprising 6,786 males and 6,972 females, giving a sex ratio of 0.97 males per female, with 3,477 people (25.3%) aged under 15 years, 3,189 (23.2%) aged 15 to 29, 5,952 (43.3%) aged 30 to 64, and 1,137 (8.3%) aged 65 or older.

Ethnicities were 40.9% European/Pākehā, 21.0% Māori, 26.1% Pacific peoples, 26.8% Asian, and 3.7% other ethnicities. People may identify with more than one ethnicity.

The percentage of people born overseas was 36.8, compared with 27.1% nationally.

Although some people chose not to answer the census's question about religious affiliation, 36.8% had no religion, 42.9% were Christian, 1.6% had Māori religious beliefs, 6.2% were Hindu, 3.5% were Muslim, 1.4% were Buddhist and 2.1% had other religions.

Of those at least 15 years old, 1,884 (18.3%) people had a bachelor's or higher degree, and 1,953 (19.0%) people had no formal qualifications. 1,182 people (11.5%) earned over $70,000 compared to 17.2% nationally. The employment status of those at least 15 was that 5,064 (49.3%) people were employed full-time, 1,293 (12.6%) were part-time, and 672 (6.5%) were unemployed.

Education
Rānui School is a contributing primary (years 1–6) school with a roll of  students. The school's bilingual unit, Whakatipu Kakano, teaches some students in  Māori.

Birdwood School is a full primary (years 1–8) school with a roll of  students. Birdwood also has a bilingual unit, Te Puawaitanga o Te Reo, which teaches a quarter of the students in Māori.

Te Kura Kaupapa Māori o Te Kotuku is a full primary (years 1–8) school which teaches primarily in Māori. It has a roll of  students. 

All schools are coeducational. Rānui and Birdwood schools have a high proportion of Māori and Pacific Island students. Te Kura Kaupapa Māori o Te Kotuku has an entirely Māori student population.

Notes

Suburbs of Auckland
Henderson-Massey Local Board Area
West Auckland, New Zealand